PITSLRE serine/threonine-protein kinase CDC2L1 is an enzyme that in humans is encoded by the CDC2L1 gene.

This gene encodes a member of the p34Cdc2 protein kinase family. p34Cdc2 kinase family members are known to be essential for eukaryotic cell cycle control. This gene is in close proximity to CDC2L2, a nearly identical gene in the same chromosomal region. The gene loci including this gene, CDC2L2, as well as metalloprotease MMP21/22, consist of two identical, tandemly linked genomic regions which are thought to be a part of the larger region that has been duplicated. This gene and CDC2L2 were shown to be deleted or altered frequently in neuroblastoma with amplified MYCN genes. The protein kinase encoded by this gene could be cleaved by caspases and was demonstrated to play roles in cell apoptosis. Several alternatively spliced variants of this gene have been reported.

Interactions
CDC2L1 has been shown to interact with Cyclin D3.

References

External links

Further reading

EC 2.7.11